The John L. Hagler House is a historic home located on Poplar Grove Road between intersections with Highway 69A and Whitney Branch Road, near Springville, Henry County, Tennessee.

It was built in 1820 by John L. Hagler and added to the National Register in 1980.

References

Houses in Henry County, Tennessee